Joseph M. Bustos is an American politician. He is a member of the South Carolina House of Representatives from the 112th District, serving since 2020. He is a member of the Republican party.

References

Living people
Republican Party members of the South Carolina House of Representatives
21st-century American politicians
People from Charleston, South Carolina
1950 births
Columbia College (South Carolina) alumni
Central Michigan University alumni